Hargeisa Stadium is a multi-sports stadium and is used mostly for football matches and currently serves as the home of Somaliland national football team. It has a capacity of 30,000.

See also

 Somaliland national football team
 Ministry of Youth and Sports (Somaliland)
 Alamzey Stadium

References

External links
Official Site of the Government of Somaliland

Stadiums in Somaliland
Buildings and structures in Hargeisa